Alis is a given name. Notable people with the name include:

Alis Boçi (born 1991), Albanian footballer
Alis Guggenheim (1903–1982), Swiss painter
Alis Kaplandjyan, Armenian actress
Alis Lesley (born 1938), American rockabilly singer
Alis Vidūnas (born 1934), Lithuanian politician